James Innes (February 1, 1833 – July 16, 1903) was a Scottish-born journalist, businessman and political figure in Ontario, Canada. He represented Wellington South in the House of Commons of Canada from 1882 to 1896 as a Liberal member.

He was born in Huntly, Aberdeenshire, the son of Alexander Innes and Elsbeth Fordyce, taught school in Scotland for five years and arrived in Canada West in 1853. He was a reporter for the Globe and British Colonist in Toronto and the Morning Banner in Hamilton. In 1861, he became the editor for the Guelph Advertiser. He became co-owner of the Guelph Weekly Mercury in 1862. In 1873, he merged that paper with the Advertiser to form the Guelph Mercury and Advertiser. Innes married Helen Gerrard in 1873. He served on the local board of education and became chairman in 1882. Innes was also president of the Dominion Life Assurance Company and helped form the Guelph Junction Railway. He died of pneumonia in Sydney, Nova Scotia at the age of 70 while travelling in eastern Canada.

Electoral record

References 

 

1833 births
1903 deaths
Deaths from pneumonia in Nova Scotia
Liberal Party of Canada MPs
Members of the House of Commons of Canada from Ontario
Canadian newspaper editors
Canadian male journalists
People from Huntly